Henry St. George Tucker (July 16, 1874 – August 8, 1959) was the 19th Presiding Bishop of the  Episcopal Church in the United States of America.

Early life and career
Tucker's parents were Episcopal priest, and later Bishop of Southern Virginia, Beverley Dandridge Tucker and Anna Maria Washington (Tucker). Tucker was descended from St. George Tucker of Williamsburg. He was educated at the University of Virginia, graduating with a BA and MA in 1895. His field was mathematics. Thereafter he studied at the Protestant Episcopal Theological Seminary in Alexandria, Virginia, graduating as a Bachelor of Divinity and subsequently being ordained to the priesthood on July 30, 1900.

First arriving in 1899, Tucker served for twenty four years as a missionary in the Nippon Sei Ko Kai, the Anglican Church in Japan. He served alongside the British Anglican Hugh James Foss, as joint bishop of the Osaka diocese, and later in 1913 was appointed Bishop of Kyoto. In 1903 he became President of St. Paul's College in Tokyo, an establishment that in 1922 gained formal recognition as Rikkyo University.

During 1918 Tucker worked alongside lay medical missionary Rudolf Teusler in Siberia supervising civilian relief work under the auspices of the Red Cross. During this period Tucker also held the rank of major in the Allied Expeditionary Force.

In 1923 Tucker returned to the United States, becoming both Professor of Pastoral Theology at Virginia Theological Seminary and bishop coadjutor of the Episcopal Diocese of Virginia. Succeeding as Bishop of Virginia in 1927, Tucker eventually became the Presiding Bishop of the Episcopal Church in the United States of America, thus becoming the leader of all Episcopalians in the United States. As an Episcopal presiding bishop, St. George Tucker is honored with a window in the Washington National Cathedral. He was the first bishop to hold this position full-time, rather than on top of a continuing diocesan appointment.

References

1874 births
1959 deaths
American expatriates in Japan
Anglican missionaries in Japan
American Anglican missionaries
Anglican bishops of Osaka
People from Warsaw, Virginia
Presiding Bishops of the Episcopal Church in the United States of America
Academic staff of Rikkyo University
Henry St. George
University of Virginia alumni
Virginia Theological Seminary alumni
Washington family
American expatriates in Russia
Protestant missionaries in Russia
Anglican missionaries in Asia
20th-century Anglican bishops in Asia
Virginia Theological Seminary faculty
Anglican bishops of Kyoto
Episcopal bishops of Virginia
20th-century Anglican bishops in the United States